Mitch Woods (born April 3, 1951, Brooklyn, New York) is an American modern day boogie-woogie, jump blues and jazz pianist and singer. Since the early 1980s he has been touring and recording with his band, the Rocket 88s. Woods calls his music, "rock-a-boogie," and with his backing band has retrospectively provided a 1940s and 1950s jump blues style.

Biography
Woods got his start playing clubs near the State University of New York Buffalo campus. He moved to San Francisco in 1971.

Originally a student of jazz and classical music, on relocation to the West Coast, Woods started playing jump and rhythm and blues. Upon hearing Louis Jordan's jive, Woods played throughout the 1970s as a soloist at local clubs. In 1984, Blind Pig released the debut album of the Rocket 88s, the band he had formed with HiTide Harris four years earlier. Steady Date with Mitch Woods & His Rocket 88s led to a national concert tour, including the San Francisco Blues Festival in 1985, as well as several European engagements. In 1988, they issued their second LP, Mr. Boogie's Back in Town.

In 1991 their third album, Solid Gold Cadillac, was released, followed by Shakin' the Shack (1993). Woods, capable in four styles of piano playing, Chicago blues, Kansas City boogie-woogie, West Coast jump blues and the poly-rhythmic accents of New Orleans, got the opportunity to play with some of his musical heroes, when he recorded his 1996 Viceroy album, Keeper of the Flame. Their next album, Jump for Joy, appeared in 2001.

The 2006 release, Big Easy Boogie featured veteran New Orleans musicians backing Woods. In 2007 Woods was nominated for the Pinetop Perkins Piano Player of the Year Award at the Blues Awards in Memphis, Tennessee, presented by the Blues Foundation.

Latterly he and his band toured with the Efes Pilsen Blues Festival.

Discography
 Steady Date with Mitch Woods & His Rocket 88s (1984) Blind Pig Records
 Mr. Boogie's Back in Town (1988) Blind Pig
 Solid Gold Cadillac (1991) Blind Pig
 Shakin' the Shack (1993) Blind Pig
 Keeper of the Flame (1996) Viceroy/Lightyear Records
 Jump for Joy! (2001) Blind Pig
 Big Easy Boogie (2006) Club 88 Records
 Jukebox Drive (2008) El Toro Records (with The Lazy Jumpers) 
 Gumbo Blues (2010) Club 88/VizzTone Records
 Blues Beyond Borders: Live in Istanbul (2012) Club 88/VizzTone Records
 Jammin' on the High Cs (2015) Club 88/VizzTone Records
 Friends Along Way (2017) eOneMusic/EOM
 A Tip of the Hat to Fats (2019) Blind Pig

See also
List of boogie woogie musicians
List of jump blues musicians

References

External links
Official website

1951 births
Living people
American blues pianists
American male pianists
American blues singers
American jazz pianists
Songwriters from New York (state)
Jump blues musicians
Boogie-woogie pianists
Musicians from Brooklyn
Singers from New York (state)
20th-century American pianists
Jazz musicians from New York (state)
21st-century American pianists
20th-century American male musicians
21st-century American male musicians
American male jazz musicians
Blind Pig Records artists
American male songwriters